The women's 500 meter at the 2016 KNSB Dutch Single Distance Championships took place in Heerenveen at the Thialf ice skating rink on Monday 28 December 2015. Although this edition was held in 2015, it was part of the 2015–2016 speed skating season.

There were 20 participants, with one withdrawal, who raced twice over 500m so that all skaters had to start once in the inner lane and once in the outer lane. There was a qualification selection incentive for the next following 2015–16 ISU Speed Skating World Cup tournaments.

Title holder was Margot Boer.

Overview

Result

Draw 1st 500m

Draw 2nd 500m

Source:

References

Single Distance Championships
2016 Single Distance
World